Lev Semyonovich Vygotsky (November 5, 1896 – June 11, 1934) was a Soviet psychologist, best known for his work on psychological development in children and creating the framework known as cultural-historical activity theory.

His major ideas include:

The Social Origin of Mind: Vygotsky believed that human mental and cognitive abilities are not biologically determined, but instead created and shaped by use of language and tools in the process of interacting and constructing the cultural and social environment. 

The Importance of Mediation: He saw mediation as the key to human development, because it leads to the use of cultural tools and becomes a pathway for psychological development through the process of interiorization. 

The Zone of Proximal Development: Vygotsky introduced the concept of the ZPD which refers to the gap between a child's current level of development and the level they are capable of reaching with tools provided by others with more knowledge. 

The Significance of Play: Vygotsky viewed play as a crucial aspect of children's development, as the best sandbox to build and develop practice of mediation.

Biography
Lev Vygodsky (he changed the spelling of his name in early 1920s to Vygotsky) was born in the town of Orsha, Belarus (then belonging to the Russian Empire) into a non-religious middle-class family of Russian Jewish extraction. His father Simkha Vygodsky was a banker. 

Vygotsky was raised in the city of Gomel, where he was homeschooled until 1911 and then obtained a formal degree with distinction in a private Jewish gymnasium, which allowed him entrance to a university. In 1913 Vygotsky was admitted to the Moscow University by mere ballot through a "Jewish Lottery": at the time a three percent Jewish student quota was administered for entry in Moscow and Saint Petersburg universities. He had an interest in the humanities and social sciences, but at the insistence of his parents he applied to the medical school at Moscow University. During the first semester of study he transferred to the law school. In parallel, he attended lectures at Shaniavskii University. Vygotsky's early interests were in the arts and, primarily, in the topics of the history of the Jewish people, the tradition, culture and Jewish identity. 

In January 1924, Vygotsky took part in the Second All-Russian Psychoneurological Congress in Petrograd (soon thereafter renamed Leningrad). After the Congress, Vygotsky met with Alexander Luria and with his help received an invitation to become a research fellow at the Psychological Institute in Moscow which was under the direction of Konstantin Kornilov. Vygotsky moved to Moscow with his new wife, Roza Smekhova. He began his career at the Psychological Institute as a "staff scientist, second class". He also became a secondary teacher, covering a period marked by his interest in the processes of learning and the role of language in learning.

By the end of 1925, Vygotsky completed his dissertation titled "The Psychology of Art", which was not published until the 1960s, and a book titled "Pedagogical Psychology", which apparently was created on the basis of lecture notes that he prepared in Gomel while he was a psychology instructor at local educational establishments. In the summer of 1925 he made his first and only trip abroad to a London congress on the education of the deaf. Upon return to the Soviet Union, he was hospitalized due to tuberculosis and would remain an invalid and out of work until the end of 1926. His dissertation was accepted as the prerequisite of a scholarly degree, which was awarded to Vygotsky in autumn 1925 in absentia.

After his release from the hospital, Vygotsky did theoretical and methodological work on the crisis in psychology, but never finished the draft of the manuscript and interrupted his work on it around mid-1927. The manuscript was published later with notable editorial interventions and distortions in 1982 and was presented by the editors as one of the most important of Vygotsky's works. In this early manuscript, Vygotsky argued for the formation of a general psychology that could unite the naturalist objectivist strands of psychological science with the more philosophical approaches of Marxist orientation. However, he also harshly criticized those of his colleagues who attempted to build a "Marxist Psychology" as an alternative to the naturalist and philosophical schools. He argued that if one wanted to build a truly Marxist Psychology, there were no shortcuts to be found by merely looking for applicable quotes in the writings of Marx. Rather one should look for a methodology that was in accordance with the Marxian spirit.

From 1926 to 1930, Vygotsky worked on a research program investigating the development of higher psychological functions, i.e. culturally governed lower psychological functions such as voluntary attention, selective memory, object-oriented action, and decision making. During this period he gathered a group of collaborators including Alexander Luria, Boris Varshava, Alexei Leontiev, Leonid Zankov, and several others. Vygotsky guided his students in researching this phenomenon from three different perspectives: 
 The instrumental approach, which aimed to understand the ways humans use objects as mediation aids in memory and reasoning.
 A developmental approach, focused on how children acquire higher cognitive functions during development
 A culture-historical approach, studying how social and cultural patterns of interaction shape forms of mediation and developmental trajectories 

Vygotsky died of a relapse of tuberculosis on June 11, 1934, at the age of 37, in Moscow. One of Vygotsky's last private notebook entries was:

This is the final thing I have done in psychology – and I will like Moses die at the summit, having glimpsed the promised land but without setting foot on it. Farewell, dear creations. The rest is silence.

Chronology of the most important events of life and career

1922-24 - worked in the psychological laboratory which he organized in Gomel Pedagogical College;

January of 1924 - meeting Luria at the II Psychoneurological Congress in Petrograd, moving from Gomel to Moscow, enrolling in graduate school and taking position at the State Institute of Experimental Psychology in Moscow;

July of 1924 - the beginning of work as the head of the sub-department of the education of physically handicapped and mentally retarded children in the department of social and legal protection of minors (SPON);

November of 1924 - during II Congress of the Social and Legal Protection of Minors in Moscow, a turn of Soviet defectology to social education was officially announced and collection of articles and materials edited by Vygotsky “Issues of the upbringing of blind, deaf and mentally retarded children” was published;

May 9, 1925 - the birth of the first child: the daughter Gita

Summer of 1925 - the only trip abroad: went to London for a defectology conference; on the way passed through Germany, where he met with German psychologists

November 5, 1925 - Vygotsky, in absence (due to illness), was awarded the title of senior researcher, equivalent to the modern degree of candidate of sciences for defense of the dissertation "Psychology of Art". The contract for the publication of The Psychology of Art was signed on November 9, 1925, but the text was published only in 1965;

November 21, 1925 to May 22, 1926 - hospitalization in the Zakharyino sanatorium-type hospital due to tuberculosis; upon discharge qualified as a disabled person until the end of the year;

1926 - Vygotsky's first book, Pedagogical Psychology, was published; writes notes and essays that would be published years later under the title "The Historical Meaning of the Psychological Crisis";

1927 - resumes work at the RANION Institute of Experimental Psychology and in a number of other institutions in Moscow and Leningrad;

September 17, 1927 - approved as a professor by the scientific and pedagogical section of the State Academic Council (SUS);

December 19, 1927 - appointed as the head of the Medical and Pedagogical Station of the Glavsotsvos of the People's Commissariat of Education of the RSFSR, remained in this position until October 1928 (dismissed on his own will);

December 28, 1927 to January 4, 1928 - First All-Russian Pedological Congress, Moscow: Vygotsky works as co-editor of the section on difficult childhood, and also presents two reports: “The development of a difficult child and its study” and "Instrumental method in pedology"; these two articles together with Zankov's report “Principles for the construction of complex programs of an auxiliary school from a pedological point of view” and Luria “On the methodology of instrumental-psychological research” become the first public presentation of "Instrumental Psychology" as a research method associated with the names of Vygotsky and Luria;

1928 - Vygotsky's second book "Pedology of School Age" was published, along with a number of articles establishing "Instrumental Psychology" approach in Russian and English language journals;

December of 1928 - after a conflict with the director of the Institute of Experimental Psychology (GIEP) K. N. Kornilov, the research activities of the Vygotsky-Luria group were curtailed in this organization, and experimental research was transferred to the Academy of Communications.

1929 - freelance scientific consultant, head of psychological laboratories at the Experimental Defectological Institute (transformed Medical-pedagogical station)

Major themes of research
Vygotsky was a pioneering psychologist with interests in the extremely diverse fields: his work covered topics such as the origin and the psychology of art, development of higher mental functions, philosophy of science and the methodology of psychological research, the relation between learning and human development, concept formation, interrelation between language and thought development, play as a psychological phenomenon, learning disabilities, and abnormal human development (aka defectology). His philosophical framework includes interpretations of the cognitive role of mediation tools, as well as the re-interpretation of well-known concepts in psychology such as internalization of knowledge. Vygotsky introduced the notion of zone of proximal development, a metaphor capable of describing the potential of human cognitive development.

His most important and widely known contribution is his theory for the development of "higher psychological functions," which emerge through unification of interpersonal connections and actions taken within a given socio-cultural environment (i.e. language, culture, society, and tool-use). It was during this period that he identified the play of young children as their "leading activity", which he understood to be the main source of preschoolers' psychological development, and which he viewed as an expression of an inseparable unity of emotional, volitional, and cognitive development. At this time, Vygotsky explored his long-time interest in the philosophy of Spinoza's examinations concerning human emotion. As his work matured, Spinoza's thought became a more central visitation in Vygotsky's later work, increasingly focused on the issue of human emotion and its role in higher psychological functions and development.

While Vygotsky never met Jean Piaget, he had read a number of his works and agreed on some of his perspectives on learning. At some point (around 1929–30), Vygotsky came to disagree with Piaget's understanding of learning and development, and held a different theoretical position from Piaget on the topic of inner speech; Piaget thought that egocentric speech follows from inner speech and "dissolved away" as children matured. Vygotsky showed that egocentric speech became inner speech, and then called "thoughts". Piaget only read Vygotsky's work after his death and openly praised him for his discovery of the social origin of children's thoughts, reasoning, and moral judgements.

Vygotsky remained virtually unknown until the late 1980s when his idea of the "zone of proximal development" became popular in educational psychology and practice.

Cultural-historical theory 
The hypothesis put forward by Vygotsky was a paradigm shift in psychology. He was first to propose that all psychological functions, which govern mental, cognitive and physical actions of the individual are not immutable but have a history of cultural development (in human history and in everyone personally) through interiorization of cultural tools. Therefore the process of transformation which is happening when current cultural tools are interiorized becomes the focus of psychological research.

It was assumed before, that individual possess function in well done, half-done or raw form, that function would unfold in the society, become complex, bigger, is enriched or, vice versa - slowed down and suppressed etc. Now we have reasons to believe that in regard of higher mental functions things are opposite. Functions first appear in social group in form of social relations of a child, then they become mental functions of an individual. For example, assumption was that every child is able to think, make arguments and proofs and look for sound reasonings. Debates with others grow from collision of these reasonings. But things are different. Research shows - debates foster thinking. Research also leads us to the same conclusions in regard to all other mental functions. 

Vygotsky posits the existence of lower and higher mental functions. The latter have social origins and complex system structure, mediated by cultural tools and controlled by an individual. Vygotsky came to the conclusion that conscious is possible because of the mediated nature of higher psychological functions. Between the stimulus and the reaction of a person (both behavioral and mental), an additional connection arises through a mediating link - a stimulus-means, or a sign. Signs are tools that mediate higher psychological functions, and control one own's behavior. A word could direct attention, create personal meaning, form a concept and coordinate.

Vygotsky illustrated his idea of mediation via Buridan's ass paradox. A problematic situation of choosing between two equal possibilities, interests Vygotsky primarily from the point of view of solving it through a coin flip - redelegating decision to the outside object - an example of using cultural tools to govern one's own psychological function of volition.

Developing a method for studying higher psychological functions, Vygotsky is guided by the principle of ex ungue leonem and, in addition to casting lots, analyzes such phenomena as using a knot in the handkerchief for remembering and finger counting.

Cultural mediation and internalization 
Vygotsky studied child development and the significant roles of cultural mediation and interpersonal communication. He observed how higher mental functions developed through these interactions, and also represented the shared knowledge of a culture. This process is known as internalization. Internalization may be understood in one respect as "knowing how". For example, the practices of riding a bicycle or pouring a cup of milk, initially, are outside and beyond the child. The mastery of the skills needed for performing these practices occurs through the activity of the child within society. A further aspect of internalization is appropriation, in which children take tools and adapt them to personal use, perhaps using them in unique ways. Internalizing the use of a pencil allows the child to use it very much for personal ends rather than drawing exactly what others in society have drawn previously:

The child acts and speaks at the same time, both are intertwined in one continuous operation for him. In this way, a blend of speech and action arises, a peculiar mixture from an adult's point of view, but a completely natural state for the child, who from the very first days of life, due to his helplessness, finds himself in conditions where the path from him to things and from things to him goes through another person.

Zone of Proximal Development 
"Zone of Proximal Development" (ZPD) is a term Vygotsky used to characterize an individual's mental development. He originally defined the ZPD as “the distance between the actual developmental level as determined by independent problem solving and the level of potential development as determined through problem solving under adult guidance or in collaboration with more capable peers.” He used the example of two children in school who originally could solve problems at an eight-year-old developmental level (that is, typical for children who were age 8). After each child received assistance from an adult, one was able to perform at a nine-year-old level and one was able to perform at a twelve-year-old level. He said "This difference between twelve and eight, or between nine and eight, is what we call the zone of proximal development." He further said that the ZPD “defines those functions that have not yet matured but are in the process of maturation, functions that will mature tomorrow but are currently in an embryonic state.” The zone is bracketed by the learner's current ability and the ability they can achieve with the aid of an instructor of some capacity.

According to Vygotsky, through the assistance of a more knowledgeable other, a child is able to learn skills or aspects of a skill that go beyond the child's actual developmental or maturational level. The lower limit of ZPD is the level of skill reached by the child working independently (also referred to as the child's developmental level). The upper limit is the level of potential skill that the child is able to reach with the assistance of a more capable instructor. In this sense, the ZPD provides a prospective view of cognitive development, as opposed to a retrospective view that characterizes development in terms of a child's independent capabilities. The advancement through and attainment of the upper limit of the ZPD is limited by the instructional and scaffolding-related capabilities of the more knowledgeable other (MKO).  The MKO is typically assumed to be an older, more experienced teacher or parent, but often can be a learner's peer or someone their junior. The MKO need not even be a person, it can be a machine or book, or other source of visual and/or audio input.

Thinking and speech 
In the last years of his life, Vygotsky paid most of his attention to the study of the relationship between thought and word in the structure of consciousness. This problem was explored in Vygotsky's book, Thinking and speech, that was published posthumously in 1934. Book was a  collection of essays and scholarly papers that Vygotsky wrote during different periods of his thought development. It was edited by his closest associates Kolbanovskii, Zankov, and Shif. The book establishes the explicit and profound connection between speech and the development of mental concepts and awareness. Vygotsky described silent inner speech as being qualitatively different from verbal external speech, but both equally important. Vygotsky believed inner speech developed from external speech via a gradual process of "internalization" (i.e., transition from the external to the internal), with younger children only really able to "think out loud". He claimed that in its mature form, inner speech would not resemble spoken language as we know it (in particular, being greatly compressed). Hence, thought itself developed socially.

Inner speech, according to Vygotsky, develops through the accumulation of long-term functional and structural changes. It branches off from the child's external speech along with the differentiation of the social and egocentric functions of speech, and, finally, the speech functions acquired by the child become the main functions of his thinking.

In this work, Vygotsky points out the genesis of the development of thinking and speech and that the relationship between them is not a constant value. 

But since we wanted to express all this in one short formula, in one sentence, we might put it thus: if at the beginning of development there stands the act, independent of the word, then at the end of it there stands the word which becomes the act, the word which makes man’s action free.

Legacy

Soviet Union
After Vygotsky's early death, his books and research were banned until Stalin's death (first collection of major texts was published in 1956). Small group of his collaborators and students were able to carry his line of thought in research. The members of the group subsequently laid a foundation for Vygotskian psychology's systematic development in such diverse fields as the psychology of memory (P. Zinchenko), perception, sensation, and movement (Zaporozhets, Asnin, A. N. Leont'ev), personality (Lidiya Bozhovich, Asnin, A. N. Leont'ev), will and volition (Zaporozhets, A. N. Leont'ev, P. Zinchenko, L. Bozhovich, Asnin), psychology of play (G. D. Lukov, Daniil El'konin) and psychology of learning (P. Zinchenko, L. Bozhovich, D. El'konin), as well as the theory of step-by-step formation of mental actions (Pyotr Gal'perin), general psychological activity theory (A. N. Leont'ev) and psychology of action (Zaporozhets). Andrey Puzyrey elaborated the ideas of Vygotsky in respect of psychotherapy and even in the broader context of deliberate psychological intervention (psychotechnique), in general.

United States
Only a couple of Vygotsky's texts were published in English before translation of Thinking and Speech in 1962. Since then, majority of his texts has been translated and his ideas become the cornerstone of modern educational approaches. First proponents of Vygotsky in the USA were Michael Cole, who went to study with Luria in 1962 and James Wertsch. Today, an umbrella term for theoretical framework based on Vygotsky's ideas is "Cultural-historical Activity theory" (aka CHAT) or "Activity theory".

Works

Consciousness as a problem in the Psychology of Behavior, 1925
Educational Psychology, 1926
Historical meaning of the crisis in Psychology, unfinished and aborted in 1927
The Problem of the Cultural Development of the Child, 1929
The Fundamental Problems of Defectology, 1929
The Socialist alteration of Man, 1930
Ape, Primitive Man, and Child: Essays in the History of Behaviour, A. R. Luria and L. S. Vygotsky, 1930
Tool and symbol in child development, 1930
Paedology of the Adolescent, 1929-1931
Play and its role in the Mental development of the Child, oral presentation 1933
Thinking and Speech, 1934
The Psychology of Art, 1971 (English translation by MIT Press)
Mind in Society: The Development of Higher Psychological Processes, 1978 (Harvard University Press)
The Collected Works of L. S. Vygotsky, 1987

See also

 Cognitivism (learning theory)
 Cultural-Historical Activity Theory (CHAT)
 Nicola Cuomo
 Laboratory of Comparative Human Cognition (LCHC)
 Leading Activity
 Organization Workshop
 PsyAnima, Dubna Psychological Journal
 Social constructivism
 Vygotsky Circle

References

Further reading

 Wertsch J. V. (1985). Vygotsky and the social formation of mind. Cambridge, MA: Harvard University Press.
 Yaroshevsky M. (1989) Lev Vygotsky. Progress, Moscow
 Kozulin A. (1990). Vygotsky's Psychology: A Biography of Ideas. Cambridge, Harvard University Press.
 Van der Veer R. & Valsiner J. (1991). Understanding Vygotsky. A quest for synthesis. Oxford, Basil Blackwell.
 Holzman L. (1993) Lev Vygotsky: Revolutionary Scientist. Routledge
 Van der Veer, R. & Valsiner, J. eds (1994). The Vygotsky Reader. Oxford, Blackwell.
 Vygodskaya, G. L., & Lifanova, T. M. (1996). Lev Semyonovich Vygotsky: Zhizn’, deyatel’nost’, shtrikhi k portretu. Moscow: Smysl. Translated in Vygodskaya, G. L., & Lifanova, T. M. Lev Semenovich Vygotsky, Journal of Russian and East European Psychology, volume 37.
 Van der Veer R. (2007). Lev Vygotsky. Continuum Books.
 Daniels, H., Wertsch, J. & Cole, M. (Eds.) (2007). The Cambridge Companion to Vygotsky.
 Dafermos, M. (2018). Rethinking Cultural-Historical Theory. Singapore, Springer.
 Zavershneva, E., & Van der Veer, R. (2018). Vygotsky’s notebooks: A selection. Singapore, Springer.

External links
 
 
 Lev Vygotsky archive, marxists.org: all major works
 Annotated bibliography of scholarly histories on Vygotsky, Advances in the History of Psychology, York University

1896 births
1934 deaths
People from Orsha
People from Orshansky Uyezd
Belarusian Jews
Soviet Jews
Belarusian scientists
Cognitive scientists
Cognitive psychologists
Communication theorists
Constructivism (psychological school)
Developmental psychologists
Educational psychologists
Literacy and society theorists
Philosophers of education
Soviet psychologists
Soviet scientists
Jewish Russian scientists
Spinoza scholars
Jewish philosophers
Spinozists
Systems psychologists
Moscow State University alumni
20th-century deaths from tuberculosis
Academic staff of Moscow State University
Imperial Moscow University alumni
20th-century psychologists
Tuberculosis deaths in the Soviet Union
Tuberculosis deaths in Russia